Pierre Perron (born March 14, 1959) is a Canadian econometrician at Boston University. Perron is known for the Phillips–Perron test of a unit root in time series regression, which was the result of his Ph.D. studies under Peter C. B. Phillips.

References

External links 
 
 Website at Boston University

1959 births
Living people
Canadian statisticians
Yale University alumni
Boston University faculty
Fellows of the Econometric Society